A high risk severe weather event is the greatest threat level issued by the Storm Prediction Center (SPC) for convective weather events in the United States. On the scale from one to five, a high risk is a level five; thus, high risks are issued only when forecasters at the SPC are confident of a major severe weather outbreak. This is usually for major tornado outbreaks and occasionally derechos, and these outlooks are typically reserved for the most extreme events. They are generally only issued on the day of the event. However, there have been two occurrences (April 7, 2006, and April 14, 2012) of a high risk being issued on day 2 (the day before the event). A high risk cannot be issued on day 3.

High risk days

1982–1989
Thirty-four high risks were issued in the 1980s.

1990–1999
Sixty high risks were issued in the 1990s.

2000–2009
There were no high risk days in 2000.

2010–2019
There were no high risk days in 2015, 2016, or 2018.

2020–present
There were no high risk days in 2020 or 2022.

See also 
 List of deadliest Storm Prediction Center days by outlook risk level
 List of Storm Prediction Center extremely critical days
 List of United States tornado emergencies

Notes

References

External links 
 High Risk archive

Lists of tornadoes in the United States
National Weather Service
Tornado-related lists
Weather warnings and advisories
Storm Prediction Center high risk days